The Messa di Santa Cecilia (mass of Saint Cecilia) is a  religious work by Alessandro Scarlatti, written in 1720 for five soloists (SSATB), choir and orchestra, commissioned by and dedicated to cardinal Francesco Acquaviva of Aragona.

Scarlatti was sixty years old at the time and composed at the beginning of the 18th century, in a modern style of the period, characterised by brio and seduction, which culminated in the great masses of Bach and Beethoven and "seems to foretell Haydn's last masses". This remarkable work, "coronation of all his church music", almost contemporary of Bach's Magnificat (1723), has nothing to envy to it, "both in terms of musical interest and stylistic synthesis of early 18th century trends".

Details  
 Kyrie, in A major 
 Gloria
 Credo
 Sanctus
 Agnus Dei, in A major 

The execution time of the 923 bars  is about 52 min. The Gloria is the most developed, exceeding 23 min. and the Credo which follows reaches 14 min.

Analysis 

Scarlatti's writing from the Kyrie is lively on the strings, close to Vivaldi and the Bolognese; the choir's interventions alternate or overlap with the singing decorated with soloists. The composer ends the Gloria with its complex structure, with an impressive five-part fugue on Cum Sancto Spirito, the subject of which is provided by the Gregorian intonation of the Mass to Saint-Cecilia, Dilecisti. The Credo, which in its style looks more to the future, is close to the writing of his own Stabat Mater, but more to that of Pergolesi seventeen years later. The joyful precipitation of the Et resurenxit which "intensifies to the tumult", contrasts with the sudden stop on et mortuo in a striking effect. The movement concludes with a fugue that takes up the subject of the Gloria in a completely different development. In the Agnus Dei, Scarlatti merges the old (voice) and new (strings) styles, until they are reversed.

In addition to the mass, still in 1720, Scarlatti composed almost as long (40 min.) vespers, discovered more recently, both scores being intended for the Santa Cecilia in Trastevere church. In 1708, he had composed Il Martirio di Santa Cecilia, inspired by the same figure, Santa Cecilia in Trastevere, patron saint of musicians.

Manuscripts 
 Rome, Biblioteca Casanatense, Ms. 2257. 
 Münster, Santini-Bibliothek, D-Müs

Modern editions 
 St. Cecilia Mass (1720) for SSATB soli and chorus, string orchestra, and organ continuo, ed. John Steel, Novello 1968  — after the Roman manuscript.

Recordings 
 Blanche Christensen, Jean Preston, soprano; Beryl-Jensen Smiley, alto; Ronald Christensen, tenor; Warren Wood, bass; the Alumnenchor of the University of Utah and the Utah Symphony, dir. Maurice Abravanel (1961, LP Amadeo AVRS5001 / Amadeus / Vanguard Records / "Alessandro Scarlatti collection", vol. 5, Brilliant Classics) , 
 Elizabeth Harwood, Wendy Eathorne, sopranos; Margaret Cable, alto; Wynford Evans, tenor; Christopher Keyte, bass; John Scott, organ; The Choir of St John's College, Cambridge; The Wren Orchestra, dir. George Guest (3-4 August 1978, LP Argo ZRG 903 / Decca Records "Seranata" 430 631-2 / "Double" 458 370-2)

See also 
 Il Martirio di Santa Cecilia

References

Bibliography 
 .
 .
 

External links 
 Messa di santa Cecilia (Kyrie) on ChoralWiki
 Messa di Santa Cecilia on AllMusic
 Messa di Santa Cecilia ; two motets on WorldCat

Compositions by Alessandro Scarlatti
1720 compositions
Christian music